Laura Põldvere (formerly Remmel; born 30 August 1988) sometimes known professionally as simply Laura, is an Estonian singer. She is said to be the most played Estonian artist on Estonian radio in the past decade.

Career 
Laura started her career in 2005, when she participated in Eurolaul 2005 with the song "Moonwalk". "Moonwalk" came second, but Laura won the contest as the member of the girl group Suntribe. Suntribe represented Estonia in the Eurovision Song Contest 2005, but failed to advance to the final.

Laura also took part at "Eurolaul 2007" for the Eurovision Song Contest 2007, her entry "Sunflowers" came third.

In September 2007, Laura released her debut album "Muusa" and started studies in Berklee College, Boston, putting her music career on hold.

In 2009, she returned to Eesti Laul as a solo singer in hopes of representing Estonia in the Eurovision Song Contest 2009. Her entry "Destiny" came third. The same year, she released her album "Ultra".

In November, 2011, Laura released her first compilation album "Sädemeid taevast", which consisted of all her singles since 2005 to 2011 as well as a track from her second studio album "Ultra".

Laura once again competed to represent Estonia in the Eurovision Song Contest 2016, entering Eesti Laul with the song "Supersonic". It placed second in the Superfinal. In Eesti Laul 2017 she competed in a duet with Koit Toome with the song "Verona" and won. They thereafter represented Estonia in the Eurovision Song Contest 2017 in Kyiv, Ukraine. Despite being fan favourites, the duo failed to advance to the Grand Final after placing 14th in their semi-final, a blended result of 6th place from the Televoting and 17th from the Juries voting. They had been predicted as likely qualifiers beforehand, ranked 5th in the second Semi-Final by betting odds and 5th by OGAE voting overall.

Laura again competed to represent Estonia at Eurovision in Eesti Laul 2020 with her song "Break Me".
Reaching the final, she finished 11th out of 12 entries.

In January 2021, it was revealed that Laura would attempt to represent Finland at Eurovision in Uuden Musiikin Kilpailu 2021 with her song "Play". She finished last in the selection with 13 points out of 7 competing artists.

Personal life 
Laura was married to pianist Joel-Rasmus Remmel in 2013. They divorced in 2016.

Her younger brother Gregor died in 2016.

Põldvere moved to Finland in 2019, and she works in Espoo.

Discography

Albums

Compilation albums

Singles

References

External links 

1988 births
Living people
21st-century Estonian women singers
Eurovision Song Contest entrants of 2017
Eurovision Song Contest entrants for Estonia
Estonian pop singers
Musicians from Tartu
Miina Härma Gymnasium alumni
Berklee College of Music alumni
Eesti Laul winners
Estonian expatriates in Finland